Albert Constantine Pannam (19 April 1914 – 17 March 1993) was an Australian rules footballer who played in the VFL between 1933 and 1943 and then again in 1945 for the Collingwood Football Club. He then was captain/coach for the Richmond Football Club Seconds side from 1946 to 1952, leading them to the premiership in 1946.  During this tenure he played twice for the Richmond senior side in 1947.  He was senior coach of Richmond from 1953 to 1955. He later coached Oakleigh in the VFA to the 1960 premiership.

He was the son of AFL legend Charlie Pannam who also was a dual premiership player, leading goalkicker and captain of Collingwood and senior coach of Richmond.

Pannam also served in the Royal Australian Air Force during World War II.

References

External links 

  (as player)
 Albert Pannam's statistics from AFL Tables (as coach)

1914 births
Australian rules footballers from Melbourne
Australian people of Greek descent
Collingwood Football Club players
Collingwood Football Club Premiership players
Richmond Football Club players
Richmond Football Club coaches
Oakleigh Football Club coaches
Copeland Trophy winners
1993 deaths
Two-time VFL/AFL Premiership players
People from Abbotsford, Victoria
Royal Australian Air Force personnel of World War II
Military personnel from Melbourne